Haydn Piano Sonatas is the fourteenth album by pianist and composer Fazıl Say (1970) from Turkey. Recorded in July 2006 in Théâtre des Quatre Saisons – Gradignan (France), and was released by Naïve Classique on February 20, 2007. Haydn Piano Sonatas features five piano sonatas by composer Joseph Haydn (1732).

Track listing

Klaviersonate D-dur N.37: I. Allegro con Brio
Klaviersonate D-dur N.37: II. Largo e Sostenuto
Klaviersonate D-dur N.37: III. Finale: Presto ma non Troppo
Klaviersonate As-dur N.43: I. Moderato
Klaviersonate As-dur N.43: II. Menuet
Klaviersonate As-dur N.43: III. Rondo Presto
Klaviersonate C-dur N.35: I. Allegro con Brio
Klaviersonate C-dur N.35: II. Adagio
Klaviersonate C-dur N.35: III. Finale Presto
Klaviersonate E-dur N.31: I. Moderato
Klaviersonate E-dur N.31: II. Allegretto
Klaviersonate E-dur N.31: III. Finale Presto
Klaviersonate C-dur N.10: I. Moderato
Klaviersonate C-dur N.10: II. Menuet
Klaviersonate C-dur N.10: III. Finale Presto

Personnel
Fazıl Say – Pianist
Jean-Pierre Loisil – Recording Producer
Laure Casenave-Péré – Sound Engineer and Editing
Didier Martin – Director, Naïve Classique
Richard Davis – Album Cover Photo
Naïve – Album Cover Art
Michel Chasteau – French Commentary & Biography Translation
Charles Johnston – English Commentary & Biography Translation

References

External links
Fazıl Say Official Website
Fazıl Say Fan Site
Naïve
iTunes
Amazon

2007 classical albums
Fazıl Say albums